Donald Purple Hart (born April 22, 1937) was bishop of the Episcopal Diocese of Hawaii from 1986 to 1994.

Early life and ministry
Hart was educated at South Kent School, Williams College, and The Episcopal Theological School, in Cambridge, Massachusetts. After his curacy in Chestnut Hill, Massachusetts, he and his wife, Elizabeth, were appointed missionaries to Alaska. They served in several small Native American villages, as chaplain to native people in Anchorage, and as rector of St. Matthews, Fairbanks. He was also rector of St James' Episcopal Church, Keene, New Hampshire.

Bishop
Hart was elected as the ninth Bishop of Hawaii on the fifth ballot In June 1986. Throughout the balloting, Hart led in both orders. On the fifth and final ballot, he received 37 clergy votes and 97 lay votes, with a majority being 33 for clergy and 85 for lay votes. He was consecrated on November 30, 1986.

Resignation
Bishop Hart resigned as Bishop of Hawaii on June 26, 1994. His resignation came about as a result of a complicated fiscal crisis stemming from the church's guaranty of a $4 million bank loan for a retirement facility which it didn't repay. In 1996 the Diocese of Hawaii's Special Committee on Episcopal Homes of Hawaii, Inc. recommended and the diocesan council agreed to take no further action against the Bishop Hart. After his resignation he served as assistant bishop in Connecticut, Maryland, and Southern Virginia.

References 

"Bishop Hart of Hawaii Resigns" in The Living Church, July 17, 1994, p. 6.

Living people
1937 births
Clergy from New York City
Episcopal bishops of Hawaii
Christian missionaries in Alaska
Williams College alumni
Episcopal Divinity School alumni